Francisco de Pisa (1534–1616) was a Spanish historian and writer.

Works
Description of the Imperial City of Toledo, i History of its antiquities, i grandeur, i memorabilia, the Reies that an señoreado, or governed, Arçobispos i his most celebrated. Part divided into five books. With the history of Sancta Leocadia. Toledo: Pedro Rodriguez, 1605; 2. ª ed. Toledo: Diego Rodriguez, 1617.

External links
 Hilario Rodríguez de Gracia: Francisco de Pisa, Diccionario Biográfico Español. Real Academia de la Historia.

Spanish male writers
People from Toledo, Spain
1534 births
1616 deaths